Nerds by Nature is the fifth extended play by electronic duo Pegboard Nerds. Nerds by Nature was released on 13 January 2017, by independent electronic music label Monstercat.

Background and composition

When announcing Nerds by Nature, Odden and Parsberg stated “We are very excited for this release! It went back and forth from being an EP and an album but ultimately we ended up with an EP as we felt that would be a stronger package. We’re stoked to have people finally hear the tracks in their full glory”.

Reception and release 
Nerds by Nature gained generally positive reviews with Cameron Sunkel of EDM.com stating "there's perhaps no better time to be a fan, as this EP truly has something to offer everyone". Landon Fleury of YourEDM stated "Though Nerds by Nature contains much of the duo’s highest quality material, this clumsy disorganization makes the EP difficult to enjoy as a solid body of work". Harsh Makwana stated "It’s quite apparent that Nerds By Nature is one heck of a musical ride that you wouldn’t want to miss".

Nerds by Nature (The Remixes) 
A remix EP was released on 16 May 2016. The EP features 5 remixes from various artists including RIOT, Virtual Riot, Andy C, Gammer, and Quiet Disorder as well as a vocal VIP of Melodymania featuring Anna Yvette as the vocalist.

Track listing

Nerds by Nature

Nerds by Nature (The Remixes)

Charts

References

2017 EPs
Electro house EPs
Dubstep EPs
Pegboard Nerds albums
Monstercat EPs